Seong-gyeong, also spelled Sung-kyung, is a Korean unisex given name.  Its meaning differs based on the hanja used to write each syllable of the name.

Hanja
There are 27 hanja with the reading "seong" and 54 hanja with the reading "gyeong" on the South Korean government's official list of hanja which may be registered for use in given names. Some ways of writing this name in hanja include:

 (성인 성 seong-in seong, 글 경 geul gyeong): "holy book". This is the given name of actress Lee Sung-kyung; her parents chose these hanja for her name to reflect their Christian religion.
 (정성 성 jeongseong seong, 공경 경 gong-gyeong gyeong): "sincere and respectful". These characters are also used to write the masculine Japanese given name Tomotaka.

People
People with this name include:
Kim Sung-kyung (born 1972), South Korean female television personality
Hari (singer) (born Jeong Sung-kyung, 1990), South Korean singer
Lee Sung-kyung (born 1990), South Korean actress

Fictional characters with this name include:
Hwang Seong-gyeong, male character in the Soul series of fighting games

See also
List of Korean given names
Seonggyeong (誠敬) is one of the epithets in the full posthumous name of Sunjong of Korea: His Imperial Majesty Emperor Sunjong Munon Muryeong Donin Seonggyeong of Korea

References

Korean unisex given names